Butterfly Lovers is an album, by Denise Ho, initially released on September 7, 2005. It is the companion album to Ho's musical stageplay, Butterfly Lovers, starring Endy Chow and herself.

Track listing
 蛹 (Cocoon) - 1:41
 化蝶 (Becoming A Butterfly) (Live Piano Version) - 4:14
 橋上 (On The Bridge) - 0:39
 不是吟詩的時候 (Not the Time to Recite Poems) - 4:20
 長不大 (Not Growing) - 3:33
 汽水樽裡的咖啡 (Coffee In A Soda Bottle) - 5:13
 血肉之驅 (Flesh and Blood) - 1:02
 十八相送 (Eighteen Send Off) - 4:10
 勞斯．萊斯 (Lucy Lois) - 4:30
 撲蝶 (Catching Butterfly) - 0:41
 有人跟蹤我 (Someone Is Stalking Me) - 2:50
 做好準備 (Be Prepared) - 3:55
 禁色 (Forbidden Color) - 4:01 (Not in version 1)
 小淇 (Qi) - 1:49
 樓台會 (Meeting at the Tower) - 2:42
 萊斯．勞斯 (Lois Lucy) - 1:16 
 化蝶 (Becoming A Butterfly) - 4:50
 蝴蝶結 (Butterfly Knot) - 1:21

VCD
Included with version 1 only.
化蝶 (Becoming A Butterfly) music video
勞斯．萊斯 (Lucy Lois) music video

DVD
Included with versions 2 and 3 only.
DVD running time: 75 Minutes
Denise Ho and the music video director - Heart to Heart Talk
化蝶 (Becoming A Butterfly) music video
禁色 (Forbidden Color) music video, featuring Anthony Wong
勞斯‧萊斯 (Lucy Lois) music video (Unseen scenes)
汽水樽裡的咖啡 (Coffee In A Soda Bottle) music video (Director's Cut)

Notes

Version 1 contains two sheets of stickers and one 15 inch by 20 inch poster.
Version 1 does not contain the song 禁色 (Forbidden Color), it is only available on versions 2 and 3 only.
Version 1 of the song, 小淇 (Young Qi), only contains music, while versions 2 and 3 contain music and lyrics.
Version 3 is the same as version 2, except the 48 page photo album is not included.

Denise Ho albums
2005 albums